Chan Hao-ching and Rika Fujiwara were the defending champions, but both players chose not to participate.

Irina Buryachok and Nadiya Kichenok won the tournament, defeating Liang Chen and Sun Shengnan in the final, 3–6, 6–3, [12–10].

Seeds

Draw

References 
 Draw

Blossom Cup - Doubles
Industrial Bank Cup